Ibsen is a Danish surname most commonly associated with the Norwegian playwright and poet Henrik Ibsen (whose family was of Danish origin). The name may also appear as Ebsen. The name is originally a patronymic, meaning "son of Ib" (Ib is a Danish variant of Jacob); however, Henrik Ibsen's family had used the name as a "frozen" patronymic (i.e. a permanent family name) since the 17th century.

Henrik Ibsen's family
Ibsen (family), including
Henrik Ibsen (1828–1906)
Suzannah Ibsen (1836–1914), wife of Henrik Ibsen
Sigurd Ibsen (1859–1930), Norwegian author and politician, son of Henrik and Suzannah Ibsen
Tancred Ibsen (1893–1978), Norwegian filmmaker and actor, son of Sigurd Ibsen
Lillebil Ibsen (1899–1989), Norwegian dancer and actress, wife of Tancred Ibsen

Other people named Ibsen
 given name
Ibsen Dana Elcar (1927-2005), actor
Ibsen Martínez (b. 1951), Venezuelan journalist and playwright

 surname
Bergliot Ibsen (1869–1953), Norwegian mezzo-soprano singer
Bjørn Aage Ibsen (1915–2007), Danish anesthetist and inventor of intensive-care medicine
Frederik Ibsen (born 1997), Danish footballer 
Michael Ibsen (born 1958), English cabinetmaker whose DNA allowed the skeleton of King Richard III of England to be identified
Rikke Ibsen (born 1990), Danish sport shooter
Zak Ibsen (b. 1972), American soccer player

See also
Ibsen (disambiguation)
Ipsen (surname)
Jepsen
Jeppesen